Mohabbat Ki Jeet(मोहब्बत की जीत) is a Bollywood film. It was released in 1943.

Cast
Cast info is as follows:
Navin Chandra
Fearless Nadia 
S Nasir,
Shakir 
Agha 
Leela Pawar

References

External links
 

1943 films
1940s Hindi-language films
Indian black-and-white films